West Makian (also known by the endonym Moi) is a divergent North Halmahera language of Indonesia. It is spoken on the coast near Makian Island, and on the western half of that island.

West Makian has been strongly influenced by a neighboring Austronesian language or languages to the extent that it was once classified as Austronesian, as East Makian (Taba) still is. As a family-level isolate, it is not closely related to any other language. A brief description of the language can be found in Voorhoeve (1982). Much influence comes from Taba, as well as Malay, Ternate, Dutch, and potentially Portuguese.

Phonology

Vowels 
West Makian has 5 or 6 vowels: /a, e, ə, i, o/, and /u/, with /ə/ not recorded by Watuseke. Voorhoeve states that /ə/ is only found in Indonesian loans.

Consonants 

 is found almost exclusively in Indonesian loanwords. The only original Moi word with /ɲ/ is /miɲe/ - 'one.'

Consonant clusters are found almost entirely in the middle of words, with a few occurring word-initially during continuous speech. The majority of words have stress on the penultimate syllable, with a few having it on the syllable before or the last syllable. Stress is primarily phonemic.

There are two types of sentence intonation so far observed. One involves the tone rising sharply then sometimes falling again, a pattern used in emphatic imperatives and sometimes in questions. The other pattern is a sharp drop at the end of the sentence, used for declarative sentences and non-emphatic imperatives.

Vowel harmony
West Makian makes use of regressive vowel harmony, which affects the vowels of several prefixes, the possessive marker, and a preposition. Specifically, they affect the prefixes fa-, ma-, and fala-; the verbal subject prefixes ta-, na-, ma-, fa-, and da-; the possessive marker da, and the lative, ablative, and locative preposition ta.

In general, for an element CV (consonant-vowel) the pattern is as follows:

However, there are many exceptions. The stative verb  ("to be dead") takes prefixes fa- ("to kill") and ma- ("to die") instead of the expected fe- and me-. The directional verbs (naso "to go to", no "to come", etc.) and the verb am ("to eat") take only verbal prefixes of the form Ci (tiam "I eat", minaso "we go to", etc.). Stative verbs are identical to directionals in terms of verbal prefixes, with the exception of the 3rd person singular, which is i- for inanimates and ma- (no vowel harmony) for animates. Additionally, in the imperative, the 2nd singular (nV-) and 2nd plural (fV-) prefixes simply assimilate to the next vowel: the verb uba ("carry") produces nuuba ("you carry it!"), fuuba ("you all carry it!").

References

Bibliography
 
 

Languages of Indonesia
North Halmahera languages